Susana Arkadyevna Kochesok (born 25 February 1995) is a Russian trampoline gymnast of Circassian ancestry from the Republic of Adygea. She qualified in the trampoline competition at the 2020 Summer Olympics.

References

External links 
 

Living people
1995 births
Russian female trampolinists
Sportspeople from Adygea
Olympic gymnasts of Russia
Gymnasts at the 2020 Summer Olympics
People from Teuchezhsky District
21st-century Russian women